Chetwynd is a surname, originally a toponymic surname of people from the village of Chetwynd, Shropshire, England. Notable people with the surname include:
Amanda Chetwynd, British mathematician and statistician
Catana Chetwynd, American cartoonist
Edward Chetwynd (1577–1639), English churchman, Dean of Bristol
George Chetwynd (civil servant) (1824–1882), Receiver and Accountant General of the British Post Office
Sir George Chetwynd (1916–1982), British lecturer, politician and public servant
Godfrey Chetwynd, 8th Viscount Chetwynd (1863–1936), British industrialist
John Chetwynd (1643–1702), English politician
John Chetwynd, 2nd Viscount Chetwynd (c.1680–1767), English diplomat and politician
Josh Chetwynd (born 1971), British journalist, broadcaster, author and former baseball player
Lionel Chetwynd (born 1940), Canadian-American screenwriter and film director and producer
Marvin Gaye Chetwynd (born Alalia Chetwynd, 1973,  Spartacus Chetwynd), British artist
Ralph Chetwynd (1890–1957), British-Canadian businessman and politician
Walter Chetwynd (Newcastle-under-Lyme MP) (died 1638), English politician
Walter Chetwynd (1633–1693), English antiquary and politician
Walter Chetwynd (Lichfield MP) (c.1680–1732), British politician, Governor of Barbados
Walter Chetwynd, 1st Viscount Chetwynd (1678–1736), English politician
William Chetwynd (MP for Wootton Bassett) (c.1691–1744), British lawyer and politician
William Chetwynd, 3rd Viscount Chetwynd (1684–1770), English politician
William Richard Chetwynd (c.1731–1765), English politician

Fictional characters
Courtney Chetwynde, character in American author D.J. MacHale's Pendragon series of science fiction/fantasy novels